Population 1 is the debut studio album of the project of the same name. The project is led by Nuno Bettencourt, formerly of Extreme. Some of the songs feature former Mourning Widows bandmates Donovan Bettencourt (bass) and Jeff Consi (drums).

The themes surrounding the album are mostly personal and intimate, given that Nuno's mother had recently died (Flow and Stiff). It also includes a tribute about 9/11, Ordinary Day.

Some of the songs were later used in the soundtrack and throughout the 2008 motion picture Smart People, as well as songs by his wife Suze DeMarchi's Baby Animals and fellow Extreme singer Gary Cherone.

Tracks
All tracks written by Bettencourt, except where noted.
 "Flow" – 4:41
 "Spaceman" – 5:00
 "High" – 4:09
 "Iron Jaw" – 4:58
 "Unhappy B-day" – 5:24
 "If Only" – 4:03
 "Ordinary Day" – 3:14
 "Rescue" – 4:38
 "QPD" – 2:33
 "Stiff" – 6:37
 "Dedication Breakup" – 5:07
 "Sick Punk" (Bettencourt, Anthony J. Resta) – 4:25

Personnel
Nuno Bettencourt – lead vocals, guitars, bass, keyboards, piano, drums

See also
 Nuno Bettencourt

Nuno Bettencourt albums
2002 debut albums